Sezen is a Turkish given name and surname. Notable people with the name include:

 Sezen Aksu (born 1954), Turkish pop music singer, songwriter and producer
 Merih Sezen (1919–2011), Turkish Olympic fencer
 Sezen Djouma (born 2002), Turkish-born child actor

Turkish-language surnames
Turkish feminine given names